Promised Land, as described in the Bible, is the land of Canaan promised by God to Abraham and his descendants. The Land of Promise (Tír Tairngire) is a name for the Irish Otherworld.

Promised Land or Land of Promise may also refer to:

Lands and Territorial Jurisdictions 

 Land of Israel
 Land of Palestine
 Holy Land

Books
 A Promised Land, a 2020 memoir by former United States President Barack Obama
 Land of Promise: An Economic History of the United States, a 2012 book by Michael Lind
 Promised Land (novel), a 1976 Spenser novel by Robert B. Parker
 Promised Land: Thirteen Books That Changed America, a 2008 book by Jay Parini
 The Promised Land (autobiography), the 1912 autobiography of Mary Antin
 The Promised Land (novel), an 1899 novel by Władysław Reymont

Film
 The Promised Land (1925 film), a French silent film
 The Promised Land (1973 film), a Chilean film
 The Promised Land (1975 film), a Polish film based
 The Promised Land (1986 film), a Yugoslav film by Veljko Bulajić
 Promised Land (1987 film), starring Kiefer Sutherland and Meg Ryan
 Promised Land (2002 film), a South African film based on the novel by Karel Schoeman
 Promised Land (2004 film), an Israeli film
 Swapnabhumi (The Promised Land), a 2007, Bangladeshi documentary film by Tanvir Mokammel
 Promised Land (2012 film), an American drama film by Gus Van Sant
 The Promised Land (2015 film), a Chinese film

Television
 Promised Land (1996 TV series), a 1996–1999 American television series starring Gerald McRaney
 The Promised Land (miniseries), a Canadian television miniseries also known as Les Brûlés
 The Promised Land, a story-arc in the eighth series of Doctor Who
 "Promised Land", a 1991 episode of Inspector Morse set in rural Australia
 "The Promised Land" (New York Undercover), a 1997 episode of New York Undercover
 "Promised Land" (The Outer Limits), a 1998 episode of The Outer Limits
 "Promised Land" (The Vampire Diaries), a 2014 episode of the TV series The Vampire Diaries
 Red Dwarf: The Promised Land, a 2020 British television film
 Promised Land (2022 TV series), a 2022 American television series

Music

Albums
 Promised Land (EP), a 1998 EP by Dispatched
 Promised Land (Harold Land album), 2001
 Promised Land (Elvis Presley album), 1975
 Promised Land (Queensrÿche album), 1994
 Promised Land (Rurutia album), 2004
 Promised Land (Robert Walker album), 1997
 Promised Land (Dar Williams album), 2008
 The Promiseland, an album by Willie Nelson, 1986
 The Promised Land (Del McCoury Band album)
 The Promised Land (Sagol 59 album), by Sagol 59 and Ami Yares
 The Promise Land, a 2001 album by Cedar Walton
 The Promised Land (Muzz album), 2020

Songs
 "Promised Land" (Chuck Berry song), a song recorded in 1965 by Chuck Berry, also recorded by Elvis Presley in 1974
 "Promised Land" (Crash Test Dummies song)
 "Promised Land" (Joe Smooth song)
 "Promised Land" (TobyMac song), 2021
 "The Promised Land" (Bruce Springsteen song), 1978
 "Promised Land" (TobyMac song), 2021
 "Promised Land", a 2010 song by Avantasia from Angel of Babylon
 "Promised Land", a 1995 song by Cast from All Change
 "Promised Land", a song by Dennis Brown
 "Promised Land", a 2005 song by Edan from Beauty and the Beat
 "The Promised Land", a song by Justin Hayward from The View from the Hill
 "Promised Land", a 1998 song by L'Arc-en-Ciel HEART
 "Land of Promise", a 2010 song by Nas and Damian Marley from Distant Relatives
 "Promised Land", a 1983 song by Riot from Born in America
 "Promised Land", a 2021 song by TobyMac
 "Promised Land", a song by the fictional band Vesuvius featured in The Rocker
 "Promiseland", a 2015 song by Mika from No Place in Heaven
 "Promiseland", a 2016 song by Sebell

Other music
 Promise Land (band), an American Christian rock band
 Promise Land (DJs), an Italian DJ and production duo
 Promised Land (duo), English duo of Nick Feldman and Jon Moss
 The Promised Land (Saint-Saëns), an oratorio by Camille Saint-Saëns

Places

Australia
 Promisedland, Queensland
 Promised Land, Tasmania

United States
 Promised Land (Braithwaite, Louisiana), a historic mansion
 Promised Land, Mississippi
 Promised Land, New York
 Promised Land State Park, Pike County, Pennsylvania
 Promised Land, South Carolina, an unincorporated community
 Promise Land, Tennessee, a former unincorporated community
 City on a Hill — declaration of american exceptionalism that employs a related biblical allegory.

Other
 Promised Land (CBC Radio One), a CBC Radio One program
 The Promised Land (radio), a radio show hosted by Majora Carter
 Promised Land (LIRR station), a former railroad station stop on the Long Island Rail Road
 The Promised Land (sculpture), a 1993 sculpture in Portland, Oregon
The Promised Land, a plot device in the Final Fantasy VII video game series

See also
 Southern Levant